Dreamless is the third studio album by American death metal band Fallujah, released on April 29, 2016. It was the last album to feature Alex Hofmann on vocals and Brian James on guitar before both departed the band between 2017 and 2019, respectively. The album was produced by Zack Ohren at Sharkbite Studios in Oakland, California, and Mark Lewis of Audio Hammer Studios. The artwork was made by Peter Mohrbacher.

Track listing 
All songs written and composed by Alex Hofmann and Scott Carstairs.

Personnel 
Writing, performance and production credits are adapted from the album liner notes.

Fallujah
 Alex Hofmann – vocals, programming
 Scott Carstairs – guitar
 Brian James – guitar
 Robert Morey – bass
 Andrew Baird – drums

Guest musicians
 Tori Letzler – vocals on "The Void Alone", "Dreamless" and "Wind for Wings"
 Katie Thompson – vocals on "Abandon", "Dreamless", and "Lacuna"
 Mike Semesky (Raunchy, ex-Intervals) – vocals on "Wind for Wings"
 Tymon Kruidenier (ex-Cynic) – guitar solo on "Dreamless"

Production
 Zack Ohren – engineer
 Mark Lewis – mixing, mastering, drum engineer

Design and artwork
 Peter Mohrbacher – cover art
 Alex Hofmann (Cypher Visual) – layout, additional artwork

References 

2016 albums
Fallujah (band) albums
Nuclear Blast albums